Microchera is a genus of hummingbirds.

Species
The genus includes three species:
Snowcap, Microchera albocoronata
Coppery-headed emerald, Microchera cupreiceps 
White-tailed emerald, Microchera chionura

The white-tailed emerald and the coppery-headed emerald were formerly placed in the genus Elvira. A molecular phylogenetic study published in 2014 found that these two species were closely related to the snowcap in the genus Microchera. The three species were therefore placed together in Microchera which has priority.

References

Microchera
Bird genera